Some People may refer to:

Some People (film), 1962
Some People, a 1927 novel by Harold Nicolson

Music

Albums

Some People (Jon English album), 1983
Some People (Belouis Some album), 1985

Songs
"Some People" (Belouis Some song), 1985
"Some People" (Cliff Richard song), 1987
"Some People" (LeAnn Rimes song), 2006
"Some People" (E. G. Daily song), 1989
"Some People", by Janis Ian from her 1978 self-titled album
"Some People", by Fra Lippo Lippi from the 1987 album Light and Shade
"Some People (Ton désir)", by Ocean Drive, 2009
"Some People", by James Reyne from the 1991 album Electric Digger Dandy
"Some People", from the 1959 musical Gypsy
"Some People", by Anne-Marie from the deluxe edition of the 2018 album Speak Your Mind
"Some People", by Goldfrapp from the 2008 album Seventh Tree